Jerzy Nowosielski (January 7, 1923 – February 21, 2011) was a Kraków-born Polish painter, graphic artist, scenographer, and illustrator.

He was well known for his religious compositions (wall paintings, iconostases, polychromies) in the Eastern Orthodox Churches in Kraków, Białystok, and Jelenia Góra, the Roman Catholic Church of the Holy Cross at Wesoła, the Franciscan Church in the Azory district of Kraków, and the Greek Catholic Church in Lourdes, France. Nowosielski designed and erected the Church of the Birth of the Blessed Virgin Mary in Biały Bór.

He also painted portraits, landscapes, still lifes, and abstract pictures.  His works are found in Polish museums and in private collections in Canada, the US, and Germany.  In 1993 he was awarded a prize by the Polish cultural foundation Wielka Fundacja Kultury, and in 2000 he received an honorary doctorate from the Jagiellonian University.

References

External links
 Nowosielski's Wedding. Prof. K.M.P. Rudnicki's tribute to Jerzy Nowosielski
 Jerzy Nowosielski at culture.pl
 

1923 births
2011 deaths
Polish male painters
Eastern Orthodox Christians from Poland
Converts to Eastern Orthodoxy from Catholicism
Polish contemporary artists